Abram Harris may refer to:

 Abram Lincoln Harris (1899–1963), American economist, academic, anthropologist and social critic of blacks in the United States
 Abram W. Harris (1858–1935), president of Northwestern University, and president of the University of Maine